William Martin McGuire (born 24 January 1957) was a Scottish footballer who played for Airdrie, Falkirk, Partick Thistle and Dumbarton.

References

1957 births
Scottish footballers
Dumbarton F.C. players
Airdrieonians F.C. (1878) players
Falkirk F.C. players
Partick Thistle F.C. players
Scottish Football League players
Living people
Petershill F.C. players
Association football forwards
Association football midfielders